Erwin Gutawa (born 6 July 1992) is an Indonesian professional footballer who plays for Liga 1 club PSM Makassar. Although he mainly plays as a centre-back, he can also play as a right-back.

Club career

Martapura
He was signed for Martapura to play in Liga 2 in the 2018 season.

Madura FC
On 20 October 2018, Gutawa signed a one-year contract with Liga 2 club Madura on a free transfer.

Sriwijaya FC
He was signed for Sriwijaya to play in Liga 2 in the 2020 season. This season was suspended on 27 March 2020 due to the COVID-19 pandemic. The season was abandoned and was declared void on 20 January 2021.

PSM Makassar
He was signed for PSM Makassar to play in Liga 1 in the 2021 season. Erwin made his league debut on 5 September by starting in a 1–1 draw against Arema at the Pakansari Stadium, Cibinong.

References

External links
 Erwin Gutawa at Soccerway

1992 births
Living people
People from Bone Regency
Sportspeople from South Sulawesi
Indonesian footballers
Liga 2 (Indonesia) players
Liga 1 (Indonesia) players
Dewa United F.C. players
Sriwijaya F.C. players
PSM Makassar players
Association football defenders